Acrocercops chrysometra is a moth of the family Gracillariidae, known from Ecuador. It was described by E. Meyrick in 1926.

References

chrysometra
Moths of South America
Moths described in 1926